Capmany is a Spanish name borne by several people in Spanish-speaking parts of the world. Noted among them are:
 Antonio de Capmany y Montpalau (1742–1813), Spanish polygraph.
 José Capmany (1961–2001), Costa Rican songwriter and guitarist.
 Maria Aurèlia Capmany (1918–1991), Catalan novelist, playwright and essayist.
 Rafael Zubarán Capmany (1875–1948), Mexican lawyer.